Titanophora is a genus of seaweeds belonging to family Schizymeniaceae of the order Nemastomatales.

Taxonomy and nomenclature 
It composes of eight taxonomically accepted species based from available data and literature.

Species 
 Titanophora calcarea (Okamura) Børgesen, 1949
 Titanophora incrustans (J.Agardh) Børgesen, 1949
 Titanophora marianensis Itono & Tsuda, 1980
 Titanophora mauritiana Børgesen, 1949
 Titanophora palmata Itono, 1972
 Titanophora pikeana (Dickie) Feldmann, 1942
 Titanophora submarina K.E.Bucher & J.N.Norris, 1992
 Titanophora weberae Børgesen, 1943

Description
The thalli are slimy and formed by calcium carbonate specifically at the medulla. They exhibit colorations ranging from pinkish to red and commonly seen attached to solid substrate (rocky surface) by small disc-like holdfast. The blade can be palmate and flabellate, with the main axis provided with simple mottling or branched outgrowths on the surface. Branching is irregular, and ultimate branchlets exhibits flat, fine, papillose to spinose morphologies.

Under a microscope, the cross-section of the blade shows four to five layers of pigmented cells located at the cortex: the outermost cells are elongate, while the innermost are roundish in shape. The cortex also possess gland cells. The medulla is composed of cylindrical unpigmented filaments.

Reproduction 
Presence of cystocarps which displays a carpogonial branch system, were mainly found at the uncalcified region of the cortex.

Distribution and ecology 
The genus Titanophora are distributed throughout the tropical to subtropical regions.

Life history 
The life history of the genus Titanophora is currently unknown. However, it may share similar reproductive patterns with other members of the family Schizymeniaceae which is characterized by a combination of vegetative and reproductive features: filaments connecting and arising directly from carpogonia; medulla producing X-shaped cells; gland cell started to disappear; supporting and auxiliary cells forming in an intercalary position on cortical fascicles; carpogonial branches producing sterile or fertile lateral branchlets; connecting filament branches fuse with an auxiliary cell; special nutritive cells are absent. Furthermore, the genus may also share similar reproductive patters with other members of Rhodophyta, such as the presence of filamentous tetrasporophyte.

Economic use/natural products 
The natural products that can be found in Titanophora, particularly in T. weberae are the following"

 iodine (I)
 carotene
 chlorophyll a
 chlorophyll d
 lutein
 r-phycocyanin
 r-phycoerythrin
 zeaxanthin
 floridean starch
 funoran
 furcellarin
 galactan
 chalinasterol
 cholesterol
 fucosterol
 sitosterol. 

Application of these natural products can be in the medicinal field, particularly for the reduction of blood cholesterol levels.

References 

Florideophyceae
Red algae genera